Hampton Edward Boggs (17 August 1921 – 31 January 1953) was an American fighter pilot and flying ace of World War II. He was the United States' second highest scoring ace with the 459th Fighter Squadron, 80th Fighter Group during the China Burma India Theater (CBI), and later served as a pilot during the Korean War. A fighter pilot with the United States Army Air Forces (USAAF) and the United States Air Force (USAF) flying the Curtiss P-40, Lockheed P-38 Lightning, the North American Aviation F-86 Sabre aircraft and also the recipient of the Distinguished Flying Cross.

Awards and decorations
    USAAF pilot badge
   USAF pilot badge
Distinguished Service Cross

Citation:

Headquarters: U.S. Army Forces-China/Burma/India, General Orders No. 131 (1944)

References

1921 births
1953 deaths
Accidental deaths in Wisconsin
American World War II flying aces
Aviators from Oklahoma
Aviators killed in aviation accidents or incidents in the United States
People from Garvin, Oklahoma
Recipients of the Distinguished Service Cross (United States)
Recipients of the Distinguished Flying Cross (United States)
United States Air Force officers
United States Army Air Forces officers
United States Army Air Forces pilots of World War II
Victims of aviation accidents or incidents in 1953